Grenant-lès-Sombernon (literally Grenant near Sombernon) is a commune in the Côte-d'Or department in eastern France.

Prior to September 16, 2005, it was known as Grenand-lès-Sombernon.

Population

See also
Communes of the Côte-d'Or department

References

Communes of Côte-d'Or